Short Gap is an unincorporated community in Mineral County, West Virginia, United States,  located at the intersection of Routes 956 and 28; approximately eight miles from Cumberland, Maryland. The community is home to Frankfort High School, as well as Frankfort Middle School, which serve the northern part of Mineral County, including students from the towns of Ridgeley and Fort Ashby. The ZIP codes for Short Gap are 26753 (Ridgeley, WV) and 26726 (Keyser, WV).

Located in Short Gap on Knobley Road is Stewart's Tavern, listed on the National Register of Historic Places in 2000.

Notable person

 Dave Roberts (1944–2009), Major League Baseball pitcher

References

Unincorporated communities in Mineral County, West Virginia
Unincorporated communities in West Virginia